The Swedish Building Wood Workers' Union (Btaf) was a trade union representing carpenters in Sweden.

The first union of the name was founded in 1904, as a split from the Swedish Wood Workers' Union, but it rejoined in 1916.  On 1 January 1924, the Wood Workers' Union was split into the Swedish Wood Industry Workers' Union and a new Btaf.  Like its predecessor, it affiliated to the Swedish Trade Union Confederation.  In 1925, the small Swedish Parquet Layers' Union joined Btaf.

On foundation, the union had 11,212 members, but it grew steadily, and by 1948 had 42,673 members.  In 1949, it merged with parts of several other unions, to form the Swedish Building Workers' Union.

Presidents
1924: Nils Linde
1942: John Grewin

References

Swedish Trade Union Confederation
Carpenters' trade unions
Trade unions in Sweden
Trade unions established in 1924
Trade unions disestablished in 1949